Patrick James Ryan (born 1952) is an Irish retired hurler who played for Kilkenny Senior Championship club Fenians. He also played for the Kilkenny senior hurling team and was a member of the All-Ireland Championship-winning teams in 1974, 1975 and 1979. His son, also P. J. Ryan, was a seven-time All-Ireland medal-winner with Kilkenny.

Honours

Fenians
Leinster Senior Club Hurling Championship (1): 1974
Kilkenny Senior Hurling Championship (5): 1970, 1972, 1973, 1974, 1977

Kilkenny
All-Ireland Senior Hurling Championship (3): 1974, 1975, 1979
Leinster Senior Hurling Championship (3): 1974, 1975, 1979

References

1952 births
Living people
Fenians hurlers
Kilkenny inter-county hurlers
Hurling goalkeepers